The First Prem Kumar Dhumal ministry is the Council of Ministers in Himachal Pradesh Legislative Assembly headed by Chief Minister Prem Kumar Dhumal.

Chief Minister and Ministers

 Prem Kumar Dhumal-Chief minister
 Sukh Ram
 Mohinder Singh 
 Kishori Lal Vaidya
 Jagat Prakash Nadda
 Mansa Ram
 Kishan Kapoor
 Ramesh Chand Choudhary
 Prakash Choudhary

See also

Second Shanta Kumar ministry  (1990–92)
Prem Kumar Dhumal second ministry

References

1990s in Himachal Pradesh
2000s in Himachal Pradesh
1998 in Indian politics
Bharatiya Janata Party state ministries
Dhumal 01
1998 establishments in Himachal Pradesh
2003 disestablishments in India
Cabinets established in 1998
Cabinets disestablished in 2003